Samoa competed at the 2009 World Championships in Athletics from 15–23 August. A team of 2 athletes was announced in preparation for the competition. Neither athlete advanced past the qualifying round in their event.

Team selection

Track and road events

Field and combined events

References
Entry list. European Athletic Association (2009-07-30). Retrieved on 2009-08-16.

External links
Official competition website

Nations at the 2009 World Championships in Athletics
World Championships in Athletics
Samoa at the World Championships in Athletics